"Kinda Miss You" is a song by Canadian singer Deborah Cox. It was written by Jessica Ashley, Leon Thomas III, and Khris Riddick-Tynes for her unreleased sixth studio album Work of Art, initially announced for an August 2015 release through Deco and Primary Wave Music, with production helmed by Thomas and Riddick-Tynes under their production moniker The Rascals. The song was released as the album's first single on February 3, 2015.

Track listing

Charts

References

2015 songs
2015 singles
Deborah Cox songs
Songs written by Leon Thomas III
Canadian dance-pop songs
Songs written by Jessica Ashley
Songs written by Khristopher Riddick-Tynes